Xia-Louise Brooks (born 16 October 1998) is an English professional wrestler and valet, currently signed to World Wonder Ring Stardom, where she competes under the ring name Xia Brookside, and is a member of Club Venus. She is best known for her time in WWE, where she performed on the NXT UK brand. She has also worked for All Star Wrestling.

Early life
Xia-Louise Brooks was born in Leicester on 16 October 1998. She is the daughter of professional wrestler Robbie Brookside.

Professional wrestling career

Independent circuit (2014–2017)
Brookside was trained by her father, as well as Robbie Dynamite and Dean Allmark. In 2015, she made her in-ring debut for All Star Wrestling in her father's native Liverpool, teaming with El Ligero to defeat Kay Lee Ray and Sammy D. In February 2016, she lost a three-way match for the ICW Women's Championship against Kay Lee Ray and Carmel Jacob. In May 2016, she took part in the Empress Pro Invitational, defeating Toni Storm in the semi-finals and Kay Lee Ray in the tournament finals. On 26 June 2016, Brookside defeated Toni Storm to become Pro Wrestling Ulster Women's champion. In 2017, at a Kamikaze Pro event, she was defeated by Rosemary.

In 2016, Brookside made her Revolution Pro Wrestling debut losing to Jinny Couture. In 2017, she began working for the Japanese World Wonder Ring Stardom promotion. She made her debut teaming with Mari Apache and Gabby Ortiz to defeat Hiromi Mimura, Konami and Starlight Kid. In her second Stardom match, Brookside and Ortiz defeated Natsuko Tora and Kaori Yoneyama of Team Jungle. During the 2017 5STAR Grand Prix she gained two points by defeating Kris Wolf in the first set of block B matches.

WWE (2018–2022)
On 30 July 2018, it was announced that Brookside would be taking part in the second WWE Mae Young Classic in August. She lost to Io Shirai in the first round. Despite her loss, she became a part of the NXT UK roster. She participated in a tournament to become the inaugural NXT UK Women's Champion but was eliminated in the first round. On the 15 May episode of NXT UK, her match with Killer Kelly ended in a no contest after Jinny introduced Jazzy Gabert sparking a feud between Jinny and Brookside.

On the 19 June episode of NXT UK, Brookside along with other women competed in a battle royal to determine who will get a future opportunity for the NXT UK Women's Championship. In the match, Brookside eliminated Jinny and Jazzy Gabert but she was the last one eliminated by Kay Lee Ray. On the 17 July episode of NXT UK, Brookside faced Jinny but she lost due to interference from Gabert. On the 24 July episode of NXT UK, Brookside, Piper Niven and NXT UK Women's Champion Toni Storm were defeated by Jinny, Gabert, and Ray. Two weeks later on the 7 August episode of NXT UK, Brookside and Niven got defeated by Jinny and Gabert after Niven left midway into the match to attack Rhea Ripley, ending Brookside's feud with Jinny. Brookside's first appearance of 2020 came in the form of a victory over Amale on 2 April episode of NXT UK.

Brookside returned to television on 1 October 2020, where she was defeated by Jinny. The following week, Brookside teamed with Dani Luna where they defeated Amale and Nina Samuels. On 12 November 2020, she defeated Samuels once again.

On 2 December 2021, episode of NXT UK, Brookside failed to win the NXT UK Women's Championship from Meiko Satomura. Over the past few months, Brookside would slowly start to turn heel for the first time in her career. Her heel turn would be cemented after she defeated Amale on the 31 March episode due to interference from her new bodyguard, Eliza Alexander. On 18 August 2022, Xia was one of the several NXT UK talents released from their contracts with the announcement of NXT UK going into hiatus and the upcoming launch of the new brand NXT Europe.

Return To World Wonder Ring Stardom (2022–present)
On 29 December 2022, Brookside would make her return to Stardom alongside the debuting Mariah May at Stardom Dream Queendom 2 accompanying a returning Mina Shirakawa for her tag match with Unagi Sayaka against Donna Del Mondo members Thekla and Mai Sakurai.

Championships and accomplishments
Empress Pro Wrestling
Empress Pro Invitational (2016)
International Pro Wrestling: United Kingdom
 IPW:UK Women's Championship (1 time)
 Pro Wrestling Illustrated
 Ranked No. 91 of the top 100 female wrestlers in the PWI Female 100 in 2019
Pro Wrestling Ulster
PWU Women's Championship (1 time)
Rise Wrestling
Up-and-Coming talent of the Year (2018)
Southside Wrestling Entertainment
SWE Tag Team Championship (1 time) - with Sean Kustom

References

External links

1998 births
Living people
Sportspeople from Leicester
English Christians
English female professional wrestlers